Wellington Oliveira dos Reis or simply Wellington (born January 9, 1989 in Cuiabá), is a Brazilian central defender. He currently plays for Mixto Esporte Clube.

Honours
Botafogo
Taça Guanabara: 2009
Campeonato Carioca: 2010

Contract
Botafogo (Loan) 5 January 2009 to 31 December 2009.

References

External links
 sambafoot
 cruzeiro.com.br 2008 stats
 cruzeiro.com.br profile
 websoccerclub
 ogol.com.br
 Futpédia

1989 births
Living people
People from Cuiabá
Brazilian footballers
Cruzeiro Esporte Clube players
Botafogo de Futebol e Regatas players
Associação Atlética Ponte Preta players
Grêmio Barueri Futebol players
Association football defenders
Sportspeople from Mato Grosso